Seksan Sukpimai ( – born 7 August 1974) also known as by the stage name Sek Loso (เสก โลโซ) is a Thai musician, Facebook live Streamer, and singer-songwriter. He is the former lead singer, guitarist, and primary songwriter of the Thai rock band Loso.

Biography
Seksan, the son of an itinerant rice-farming family, moved to Bangkok at age 12 and found work in a shop owned by an aunt, making jewelry. He also worked in a factory that made air conditioners. In 1991, inspired by his favorite artists, including Guns N' Roses and Carabao, he saved up enough to buy an inexpensive guitar, learned some chords and talked his way onto the stage at one of Bangkok's best-known live-music venues at the time, Austin Pub. Within a year, the 17-year-old singer-guitarist was leading the house band, playing covers of Thai rock, indie and pop, as well as Green Day, Nirvana, the Rolling Stones and Jimi Hendrix.

In 2016 he was convicted of assaulting an acquaintance; after being sentenced to a suspended prison sentence (two and a half years) and community service, he "called on youngsters and his fans to have self-restraint during any provocative event and be cautious when posting comments in the social media".

Incident at Lincoln Center
Sek Loso performed in a rock opera adaptation of the Ramakien national epic on 28-30 July 2006 at the Lincoln Center for Performing Arts in New York.

On stage, during the first night's performance, he struck another Thai on the head with a shoe, during an altercation. The two musicians then grappled with each other and eventually took their fight offstage. A video of the altercation was shown on television in Thailand and was later posted to YouTube. Sek refused to return to the production and Loso rhythm guitarist Tom Loso replaced the frontman as Phra Rama for the remainder of the show.

Discography

Loso
 Lo Society (1996)
 Lo Society Bonus Tracks (1996)
 Redbike Story (1997) (movie soundtrack)
 Entertainment (1998)
 Best of Loso (CD 1999)
 Rock & Roll (2000)
 Losoland (2001)
 The Red Album (August 2001)
 Best of Loso (Karaoke VCD, 2001)
 Loso Concert For Friends (VCD 2002)
 Loso Best Of Collection (30 April 2013)

Solo releases
 7 August (April 2003)
 Sek Loso: The Collection (June 2005)
 Black & White (July 26, 2006)
 Sek - Album Sek Loso (May 28, 2009)
 Plus (22 June 2010)
 New (23 December 2010)
 I'm Back'' (17 October 2013)

His backup band
Despite being a backup band for Sek's solo career, it still referred to as Loso according to Sek's official Facebook account.

 Seksan Sukpimai (Sek Loso) - Lead Vocal, Guitar
 Worabut Thiaprasert (Tom Loso) - Guitar
 Chaiwat Chaiwirat (Chay Loso) - Bass
 Akkanat Wanchaitiwat (Zom Naka) - Drums
 Nathanat Hiransomboon (Teddy Loso) - Keyboard, Piano

Former Band Members

 Pradit Worasutthiphisit (Dit Loso) - Bass
 Chris Borsberry (Chris Loso) - Guitar
 Paul Arthurs (Bonehead) - Guitar
 Eric Anthony Lavansch (Eric Loso) - Drums
 Anthony Wilson (Eddie Loso) - Bass
 Tortrakul Baiyern (Tor Loso) - Drums
 Thani Phromsri (Goy Loso) - Guitar

References 

Living people
Seksan Sukpimai
1974 births
Seksan Sukpimai
Rock singers
Rock guitarists
Seksan Sukpimai
Rock songwriters
21st-century guitarists
Seksan Sukpimai
Seksan Sukpimai